Roderick A. Houston (born June 9, 1962) is an American politician. He has served as a Democratic member for the 89th district in the Kansas House of Representatives from 2013 to 2017.

References

1962 births
Living people
Democratic Party members of the Kansas House of Representatives
21st-century American politicians
Politicians from Wichita, Kansas
Cowley County Community College alumni
Wichita State University alumni